The Romanian literacy campaign was started by the Romanian Communist Party government through the Education Law of 1948 and nearly eliminated illiteracy in Romania within six years.

Throughout the first half of the 20th century, Romania had one of the largest illiteracy rates in Europe. In the 1930s, 43% of the adults were illiterate and in October 1945, Romania still had 4.2 million illiterate adults (1.9 million men and 2.3 million women).

The campaign, which was done "like a military offensive" and within it, participated volunteers, including university professors, members of the academia and scientists, who inaugurated schools in the villages. It was aimed both at the children who abandoned or didn't attend school and at adults (14-55 years old), who, following one or two years of studies, they'd get a diploma equivalent to the 4 years of primary school.

See also
Literacy in Romania
Likbez
Cuban Literacy Campaign
Nicaraguan Literacy Campaign

References

Socialist Republic of Romania
Literacy
Education in Romania